Naveen Waqar is a Pakistani television actress and former video and radio jockey. She is best known for her negative role as Sara in 2012 series Humsafar. Her television appearances includes a series of acclaim projects including Annie Ki Ayegi Baraat, Uff Meri Family, Alvida, Mol, Saya-e-Deewar Bhi Nahi, Kuch Na Kaho, Be Inteha, Tajdeed-e-Wafa and Mah-e-Tamaam. She made her film debut in 2013 with social-drama film Josh: Independence Through Unity, which was a critical and commercial success.

Personal life 
She married actor Azfar Ali in 2012; the couple was divorced in November 2015.

Career
Waqar started her career as VJ Fuse which was an instant success and landed as the parallel lead in all-time blockbuster Humsafar  opposite Mahira Khan and Fawad Khan. Waqar's next venture was Geo TV's hit Ainnie ki ayegi Baraat. Waqar is known for her serious acting skills and has established a career in Pakistani television industry.

Filmography

Films

Television

Other appearance

References

External links

Pakistani female models
Living people
Pakistani radio presenters
Pakistani television actresses
Pakistani film actresses
VJs (media personalities)
21st-century Pakistani actresses
1985 births